Johnson Bluff is a conspicuous rock bluff  east-northeast of Ranfurly Point, overlooking the east side of Keltie Glacier at its confluence with Beardmore Glacier, Antarctica. It was named by the Advisory Committee on Antarctic Names for Dwight L. Johnson, a United States Antarctic Research Program biologist at McMurdo Station in 1963.

References

Cliffs of the Ross Dependency
Dufek Coast